This is a list of Roman governors of Lower Moesia (Moesia Inferior), located where the modern states of Bulgaria and Romania (Dobruja) currently are. This province was created from the province of Moesia by the Emperor Domitian in AD 86.

See also 
 List of Roman governors of Moesia
 List of Roman governors of Upper Moesia

Notes

References
Dicţionar de istorie veche a României ("Dictionary of ancient Romanian history") (1976) Editura Ştiinţifică şi Enciclopedică, pp. 399-401
 Legates for AD 86 to 138 are based on Werner Eck, "Jahres- und Provinzialfasten der senatorischen Statthalter von 69/70 bis 138/139", Chiron, 12 (1982), pp. 281-362; 13 (1983), pp. 147-237.
 Legates for AD 138 to 177 are based on Géza Alföldy, Konsulat und Senatorenstand unter der Antoninen (Bonn: Rudolf Habelt Verlag, 1977), pp. 230-233.
 Legates for A.D. 193 to 217/218 are based on D. Boteva, "Legati Augusti Pro Praetore Moesiaie Inferioris A.D. 193-217/218", Zeitschrift für Papyrologie und Epigraphik, 110 (1996), pp. 239-247.
 Legates for A.D. 218 to 238 are based on Paul M.M. Leunissen, Konsuln und konsulare in der zeit von Commodus bis Severus Alexander: 180-235 n. Chr. (Amsterdam: Verlag J.C. Gieben, 1989), pp. 252-254

 
Moesia, Lower